Kushata Kwemoyo is a 2018 Zimbabwean drama film produced and directed by Shem Zemura. The film stars Kudzai Msungo, Charles Muzemba and Gamuchirai Duve in the main lead roles. The film was set in the backdrop of communal lands of Murewa and Harare's affluent suburbs.

Synopsis 
Chiedza (Gamuchirai Duve) who was abused during her childhood by her step-mother later becomes a rough and tough woman who hates her family.

Cast 
 Kudzai Msungo as Pedzisai
 Charles Muzemba as Baba Sean
 Gamuchirai Duve as Chiedza
 Alaika Bhasikoro as Mai Pedzisai
 Elijah Madzikatire as Baba Pedzisai

Release 
The film was first premiered on 22 February 2018 in Zimbabwe. It was also screened at few international film festivals. The film was screened at the 2019 Zimbabwe International Film Festival. It won Best Southern African film at the 2021 Sotambe International Film and Arts Festival in Zambia.

The film was also chosen as one of the African films to be streamed via Mnet Afro-Cinema, a pop-up channel which was launched by MultiChoice in order to showcase and celebrate the contemporary African films during the COVID-19 pandemic. It was supposed to be streamed on 26 May 2021 as part of MultiChoice's Africa Day celebration week but had it to be postponed due to technical faults.

Awards and nominations 
The film received few awards and nominations at film festivals.

References

External links 

 

2018 films
Zimbabwean drama films
Shona-language films
2018 drama films